Movement for Democracy and Development may refer to:

Citizens' Movement for Democracy and Development in Togo
Congolese Movement for Democracy and Integral Development in the Republic of the Congo
Movement for Democracy and Development (Central African Republic)
National Republican Movement for Democracy and Development in Rwanda

See also
Movement for Democracy (disambiguation)
Democracy and Development (disambiguation)